Flor Silvestre, vol. 6 is a studio album by Mexican singer Flor Silvestre, released in 1967 by Musart Records.

Track listing
Side one

Side two

External links
 Flor Silvestre, vol. 6 at AllMusic

1967 albums
Musart Records albums
Spanish-language albums
Flor Silvestre albums